Everyday I Love You is a 2015 Filipino romantic-drama film directed by Mae Cruz-Alviar. The screenplay is from writers Vanessa R. Valdez, Kookai Labayen, Iris Lacap, and Gilliann Ebreo. The film stars the year's breakthrough love team, Enrique Gil and Liza Soberano, together with Gerald Anderson. It was released October 28, 2015, and made 16 million pesos on its first day of showing and received generally positive reviews from critics.

Plot
A young woman, whose boyfriend is in a coma, falls in love with an achievement-oriented young man, leaving her torn between the man of her dreams, and the man who makes her dreams come true.

Background Story
Ethan (Enrique Gil) is a driven young man from Manila who works for a TV company. While Audrey (Liza Soberano) is a romantic old soul from Silay who is in a relationship with laid-back haciendero, Tristan (Gerald Anderson).

Cast

Main cast

 Enrique Gil as Ethan Joseph Alfaro
 Liza Soberano as Audrey Locsin
 Gerald Anderson as Tristan Montelibano

Supporting cast
 Aiko Melendez as Guada Locsin, Audrey's Mom
 Carmina Villaroel as Gina
 Marissa Delgado as Lola Maribel
 Liza Lorena as Lola Vivian / Lavi, Ethan's Grandmother
 Candy Pangilinan as Ninang Beth/Ethan's Godmother
 Carla Martinez as Rikki
 Eva Darren as Lola Marivic
 Marita Zobel as Lola Maricar
 Dindo Arroyo as Peter Alfaro/Ethan's Dad
 Edwin Reyes as Mark Montelibano/Tristan's Dad
 Cris Villonco as Helen Locsin/Audrey's Sister
 Niña Dolino as Carmel
 Kristel Moreno as Linda
 Joj Agpangan as Marga
 Alfred Chua as Alfred
 Bryan Santos as Jeff
 Dwight Gaston as Alex
 Yana Asistio as Jamie
 Ariel Rivera as Dr. Rex "Anthony" Madrigal
 Elisse Joson as Andrea Alfaro/Ethan's youngest Sister
 Andrea Brillantes as teenage Audrey
 Paul Salas as teenage Tristan 
 Jojo Abellana as Joselito Locsin, Audrey's Dad

Production

Development
Everyday, I Love You is a romantic-drama film directed by blockbuster hit-maker, Mae Czarina Cruz-Alviar. This will mark a reunion with Gerald Anderson, who worked previously with Direk Mae in Catch Me, I'm in Love, and with Enrique Gil and Liza Soberano, whom she worked with in 2013's romantic-comedy film She's The One.

In a story conference held July 28, Liza and Enrique talked about their roles in their upcoming Star Cinema movie. Liza plays Audrey, whom she describes as a “romantic with an old soul.” "I live in Silay, Bacolod, and I'm the type of person who's very patient." Meanwhile, Enrique plays Ethan, a guy who grew up with his father when his mother abandoned them to return to her first love. Unlike Liza's character, Enrique's is one who wants everything to be fast- paced. Playing third wheel is Gerald Anderson, who is cast as Tristan, Audrey's boyfriend. Gerald describes his character as a 'probinsyano' and an old soul like his girlfriend. He is also a family man, but “something happens which changes my life completely.” 

Direk Mae also said the reason why they chose "The Ruins" as part of the movie is because of its romantic feels. She also added that "...the cast gets a sense of mystery, sense of history, and sense of olden times" in an interview conducted in The Morning Show Bacolod.

However Enrique Gil & Gerald Anderson Reuniting from The Kimerald's Last Film in 2010 Till My Heartaches End, Meanwhile, Direk Mae Decided  both Gil & Anderson Movie Tandem Together with Liza Soberano last July 30, 2015, at the Meeting of Star Creatives Office inside at ABS-CBN Broadcasting Center.

Filming
Filming began on July 30, 2015, at Bonifacio Global City. Although it was interrupted due to "Ghost Month" (which happened between August and September), they resumed filming in early September. Much of the production was on location in Silay, Manapla, specifically . Sta. Rosalia Gaston Bacolod. They also filmed some parts of the movie in Pila, Laguna.

Music
It Might Be You was originally sung by Stephen Bishop for the 1982 film Tootsie. On October 8, Star Music announced and released the official music video of "It Might Be You", a rendition from Your Face Sounds Familiar contestant and Harana member Michael Pangilinan. This version of Michael's will serve as the official theme song of the film. This also marks his second time to sing the official theme song of hit love team, LizQuen. He sang the official theme song, an OPM classic, "Smile In Your Heart" with the Harana Boys in Just The Way You Are, LizQuen's first film.

Full Cast & Crew
Starring: Enrique Gil, Liza Soberano, & Gerald Anderson, Together With Cai Cortez, Aiko Melendez, Marissa Delgado, Liza Lorena, Bryan Santos, Edwin Reyes, Marita Zobel, Eva Darren, Niña Dolino, Kristel Moreno, Cris Villonco, Dindo Arroyo, Manuel Chua, & Candy Pangilinan, With The Special Participation of: Carmina Villaroel, Elisse Joson, Ariel Rivera & Andrea Brillantes
Directed by: Mae Cruz-Alviar
Produced by: Kris G. Gazmen, Charo Santos-Concio & Malou Santos
Music by: Jesse Lasaten
Film Edited by: Marya Ignacio 
Production Designed by: Winston Acuyong
Written by: Vanessa R. Valdez Kookai Labayen Iris Lacap & Gilliann Ebreo 
Sound by: April Castro (dubbing supervisor), Noel Urbano (dubbing supervisor)
Camera & Electrical Department: Mico Manalaysay (cameramen), Cesca Lee (camera operator), Joel Casaul (car mount/tents - as Joel Casaol), Nonito Cesario (second assistant camera)
Costume & Wardrobe Department: Adonis Barsuela	wardrobe master (as Adonis N. Berzuela)

Marketing
On September 29, during the premiere night of Etiquette for Mistresses, a teaser of Star Cinema's upcoming film for the month of October was released, titled Everyday, I Love You.

On September 30, 2015, before midnight, Star Cinema released the first theatrical teaser of the film in their personal YouTube account.

On October 14, Star Cinema launched the theatrical full trailer of the film during the commercial break of FPJ's Ang Probinsyano.

On October 23, Star Cinema showed the second theatrical trailer of Everyday, I Love You during the commercial break of Pangako Sa 'Yo.

On October 28, the official movie hashtag #NATIONALILOVEYOUDAY trended nationwide on Twitter. LizQuen fans proved unstoppable, which caused the hashtag to later gain even more traction and worldwide attention (it reached the number one spot in several lists, and ultimately garnered more than 3 million tweets). It trended in a record 62 countries, with Hollywood and international celebrities/institutions (USA Today, MTV, Star Wars, SNL, NBC, Harry Styles, Miranda Kerr, Antonio Banderas, Zoe Saldana, and many others) joining in on the "I love you" trend.

Release
The film was released on October 28, 2015, nationwide. The US and Canada premiere was on November 6. 7, 8 was in UK, Austria, Italy, France, and Spain, and on November 12, in Middle East, Australia and New Zealand, on November 14 and 15 UK and, on November 22 was in Singapore.

Rating
The film received a graded B by the Cinema Evaluation Board. It also was Rated G by the Movie and Television Review and Classification Board (MTRCB).

Box office
Everyday I Love You earned ₱16 million on its first day of showing. After less than two weeks, it earned ₱100 million. The total worldwide gross is ₱178,739,010 after three weeks.

Reception

Critical response
Everyday I Love You received positive reviews. Rito Asilo of Philippine Daily Inquirer praised the film saying, "The swoon-worthy romantic tear-jerker effectively brings out what makes Tinseltown’s most photogenic young couple tick and click, and gives hopeless romantics good reason to happily swoon in their seats—but, at the expense of Gerald Anderson, who fritters his third-wheel character Tristan’s romantic chances away, “While You Were Sleeping”-style!" And the lead cast also received praises saying "Enrique and Liza don’t just play to the peanut gallery, they make their potent kilig moments soar. The intimate scenes they share are organically staged by Alviar with a lot of heart, fueled further by Soberano’s disarming dramatic perspicacity and appealing presence." Moreover, he highly praises Liza Soberano, "The gorgeously photographed film’s biggest thespic draw is its leading lady: Soberano’s acting choices may need more texture and refinement—but, at only 17, lovely Liza is quickly coming into her own as a fine actress!". Abby Mendoza of Pep.ph said "Everyday I Love You doesn’t make things difficult for itself. It remains focused and grounded on its premise, reinforcing it with a coherent plot, great performances, and the formidable chemistry between its two leads. While Enrique Gil confirms that he is by now adept at leading man roles, it is Liza Soberano who particularly stands out—which isn’t to harp on her beautiful face on screen. She is a natural who displays the right restraint, pleasing to watch all the more since she doesn’t try too hard. Gerald Anderson, who deviates from his conventional leading man roles in this film, makes for an effective third party.

The Cinema Evaluation Board of the Philippines said "The Film Deserves an incentive for Imparting good values and its wholesome entertainment". On Director, "Director Mae Cruz-Alviar, whose forte seems to be the romantic comedy, appears well at home in this latest project, capable and sincere and devoid of pretension." On Cinematography, there was "nice use of available light in the Negros scenes, where filmmakers must be commended for making the province a veritable character in the movie." And they also praised Liza Soberano raving, "Winning unanimous raves was lead Liza Soberano who displays depth and range and shows much promise. How can someone so young be so adept at her role which she nails down beautifully?"

Awards and nominations

References

2015 films
Philippine romantic comedy films
2015 romantic comedy films
2010s Tagalog-language films
Star Cinema comedy films
2010s English-language films
Films directed by Mae Cruz-Alviar